The U-Bahn Kontrollöre in tiefgefrorenen Frauenkleidern were an a cappella band from Hesse, Germany. The quintet was founded in 1991 and termed itself "hardcore a cappella", with members Harald Bannoehr, Matthias Keller, Sebastian Rajkovic, Filippo Tiberia, and Oliver Hart. The group combined music and comedy. In March 2008, the band announced their farewell for May 2009, the title of their farewell tour was "Wir sind dann mal weg“ (We're off).

Discography 

 1996 - RabimmelRabammelRabumm
 1998 - Simsalabimbambasaladusaladim
 2002 - Gesichtsgünther
 2004 - Glücklich
 2005 - Hardcore acapella
 2007 - Vollgas

References

External links
Official site

German musical groups